Veyil is a 2006 Indian Tamil-language drama film written and directed by Vasanthabalan. The film stars Bharath, Pasupathy, Bhavana, Priyanka and Sriya Reddy. Upon release, it was commercially successful. The film was remade in Bengali Bangladesh as Antor Jala starring Zayed Khan and Pori Moni. The first third of Veyil is very loosely based upon the 1988 Italian classic Cinema Paradiso. It is the first Tamil film screened at Cannes as part of the 2007 Cannes Film Festival under the 'Tous les Cinemas du Monde’ section.

Plot

The story is an emotional drama involving a father and his two sons.

Mayandi Thevar, is a butcher who works hard to bring up his four children (two boys and two girls) and have a happy family. Mayandi's sons are Murugesan and Kathir, and Murugesan dotes on his younger brother Kathir. Murugesan's weakness, like any other adolescent, is a love for movies (especially MGR films) that are screened in a local theatre. One day, life changes for Murugesan when his father catches him red-handed from the theatre after he bunks school. Murugesan is severely punished and runs away from home, taking money and jewels.

Along the way, Murugesan gets sidetracked from his intended destination of Chennai by an MGR movie poster. He is shown watching several MGR shows, buying a change of clothes, and eating a hearty meal with his ill-gotten money. After spending the night at local temple, he wakes up to find his money and other possessions missing. Murugesan is then taken under the wings of a theatre projectionist in a nearby town. Slowly, the theatre becomes his home.

As adults, Murugesan and Kathir, fall in love with Thangam and Meenakshi respectively. Thangam is a beautiful girl who lives opposite the theatre, and Meenakshi is an innocent girl. Parallel narration, Kathir starts an advertising agency, and faces opposition from Bose and Annachi, the local gangster.

Murugesan's love ends in Thangam's suicide because her father and his relatives beat up and hang Murugesan as they are trying to kill him due to their dislike of him. At that moment, Thangam shows up with a knife and threatens to kill herself if they do not release Murugesan; as they do not release him, she cuts her throat and dies. Murugesan is heartbroken and is released at that moment after Thangam's death, and he begins to drink heavily. Sometime later, the theatre is demolished, the owner citing loss of business.

Murugesan decides to return home after 20 years. The rest of the film is all about Murugesan's mental turmoil as he is caught between the deep love showered by his younger brother Kathir, and his guilt of not being a responsible son or elder brother, and Murugesan's remorse to his parents. Then there is Paandi, Murugesan's childhood sweetheart.

Bose, fearing that Kathir will be a challenge to his advertising company, ruins Kathir's agency with the help of Annachi. Kathir retaliates by trying to kill Bose but gets stopped by Murugesan. One day, jewels go missing in their house, Murugesan's father suspects him as the thief of their jewels and insults Murugesan in front of everyone, when their daughter arrives and tells him that she took them. After an emotional conversation with his father, he decides to return.

Kathir learns of this and goes to the bus station to bring Murugesan back. But there, Bose's and Annachi's men stab Kathir. In retaliation, Murugesan beats a few thugs. Kathir is rushed to a hospital and is in critical condition. The night, Murugesan decides to avenge his brother's injury. Murugesan goes to Annachi's place, engages in a duel with him, and becomes unconscious. Bose arrives there with his men and tells him that his brother is dead. Believing that his brother is dead, Murugesan kills Bose, and all his men and is stabbed by Bose in the fight. Murugesan dies, while Kathir becomes stable and recovers in the hospital. The next day, all mourn Murugesan's death, and his father is filled with remorse for not having trusted his son when he was alive.

Cast

 Bharath as Kathir
 Pasupathy as Murugesan
 Bhavana as Meenakshi
 Priyanka Nair as Thangam
 Sriya Reddy as Paandiyamma
 Ravi Mariya as Bose
 G. M. Kumar as Mayandi Thevar
 Chaams as Meenakshi's brother
 T. K. Kala
 Bombay Gnanam
 Vijayachander
 Periya Karuppu Thevar
 Kadhal Sukumar
 R. S. G. Chelladurai

Production
Veyil is the first Tamil film to be shot in Virudhunagar. Director and writer Vasanthabalan said that after he wrote the story, Shankar was impressed and asked him to expand it into a screenplay. Sandhya was supposed to play the female lead but was replaced by Bhavana.

Soundtrack
Soundtrack was composed by debutant G. V. Prakash Kumar, nephew of A. R. Rahman. The soundtrack became hugely popular and received positive reviews from critics.

Festivals
 Cannes International Film Festival 2007 - Screened under [TOUS LES CINEMAS DU MONDE]
 Shanghai International Film Festival 2007 - Nominee under [Asian New Talent Award]
 Habitat International Film Festival 2007 - Screened
 Pune International Film Festival 2007 - Screened under [INDIAN BIOSCOPE]

Accolades
 National Film Award for Best Feature Film in Tamil - 2006
 Elemec's 3rd Amrita Film Awards — Won Best Other Language Film
 Filmfare Award for Best Tamil Film - S. Shankar
 Filmfare Award for Best Tamil Director - Vasanthabalan
 Tamil Nadu State Film Award for Best Film - 2006

Critical reception
Rediff.com wrote "Director Vasantha Balan has deftly handled the script, making it his own. By maintaining an energetic pace throughout, he ensures the story doesn't become monotonous or conventional, despite the somewhat predictable plot. His characters are distinctly human with myriad personality flaws, so that the audience can identify with them". Behindwoods wrote "Veyil is an emotional epic. A must watch for all especially parents." Sify wrote "Once again Shankar has introduced Vasantha Balan a director who understands the nuances of making a realistic film with well-etched out characters and strong screenplay."

References

External links 
 

2000s Tamil-language films
2006 drama films
2006 films
Best Tamil Feature Film National Film Award winners
Films directed by Vasanthabalan
Films scored by G. V. Prakash Kumar
Films shot in Madurai
Indian drama films